The Kiev class, Soviet designation Project 1143 Krechyet (gyrfalcon), was the first class of fixed-wing aircraft carriers (heavy aircraft cruiser in Soviet classification) built in the Soviet Union for the Soviet Navy.

History
Laid down in 1970, the first ship of the class,  Kiev, was partially based on a design for a full-deck carrier proposed in Project Orel. Originally the Soviet Navy wanted a supercarrier similar to the American . However, the smaller Kiev-class design was chosen because it was considered more cost-effective.

Unlike most NATO aircraft carriers, such as U.S. or most British ones, the Kiev class is a combination of both a cruiser and an aircraft carrier. In the Soviet Navy, this class of ships was specifically designated as a "heavy aviation cruiser" rather than solely as an aircraft carrier. This designation allowed the ships to transit the Turkish Straits, while the 1936 Montreux Convention prohibited aircraft carriers heavier than 15,000 tons from passing through the Straits.

The ships were designed with a large island superstructure to starboard, with an angled flight-deck 2/3rds of the length of the total deck; the foredeck was taken up with heavy  surface-to-air and surface-to-surface missile armament. The intended mission of the Kiev class was support for strategic missile submarines, other surface ships and naval aviation; it was capable of engaging in anti-aircraft, anti-submarine, and surface warfare.

The Soviet Union built and commissioned a total of four Kiev-class carriers, which served in the Soviet and then the Russian navies. The first two ships were sold to China as museums, and the third ship was scrapped.

General characteristics 
 Designer: Nevskoye Planning and Design Bureau
 Builder: Nikolayev South (formerly Chernomorsky Shipyard 444)
 Power plant: 8 turbopressurized boilers, 4 steam turbines (200,000 shp), four shafts
 Length:  overall ( for Baku subgroup)
 Flight Deck Width: 
 Beam: 
 Displacement: 43,000–45,500 metric tons full load
 Speed: 
 Aircraft: 26–30
 12–13 Yak-38 VSTOL
 14–17 Ka-25 or Ka-27/29 helicopters
 Crew: 1,200–1,600 (including air wing)
 Armament:
 Kiev and Minsk:
 4 × twin P-500 Bazalt SSM launchers (8 missiles)
 2 × twin M-11 Shtorm SAM launchers (72 missiles)
 2 × twin 9K33 Osa launchers (40 missiles)
 2 × AK-726 twin 76.2 mm AA guns
 8 × AK-630 30 mm CIWS
 10 × 21" torpedo tubes
 1 × twin SUW-N-1 FRAS Anti-Submarine Rocket launcher
 Novorossiysk:
 4 × twin P-500 Bazalt SSM launchers (8 missiles)
 2 × twin M-11 Shtorm SAM launchers (72 missiles)
 2 × AK-726 twin 76.2 mm AA guns
 8 × AK-630 30 mm CIWS
 1 × twin SUW-N-1 FRAS Anti-Submarine Rocket launcher
 Baku:
 6 × twin P-500 Bazalt SSM launchers (12 missiles)
 24 × 8-cell 9K330 Tor vertical SAM launchers (192 missiles)
 2 × 100 mm guns
 8 × AK-630 30 mm CIWS
 10 × 21" torpedo tubes
 2 × RBU-6000 anti-submarine rocket launchers
 Date deployed: 1975 (Kiev)

Ships

See also 
 Flight deck cruiser
 List of ships of the Soviet Navy
 List of aircraft carriers of Russia and the Soviet Union
 List of ships of Russia by project number

References

External links 

 Article on the Kiev Class 
 Article in English from FAS 
 History of the Kiev 
 Project 1143 Kiev  
 Kiev Class Aircraft Carriers
 MaritimeQuest Kiev Class Overview
 History of soviet aircraft carrier development
 Project 1143 Kiev
 Project 11434 Baku/Admiral Gorshkov

Aircraft cruiser classes
 
Kiev class aircraft carrier
Ship classes of the Russian Navy